Nesrin Topkapı (born as Nesrin Gökkaya; 1951) is a Turkish belly dancer. She is known as the first belly dancer to appear on TRT screens.

Biography 
Nesrin Gökkaya born in Akhisar, Manisa Province, learned to dance from her mother Rabia Gökkaya at a young age. She also took ballet lessons. She appeared on the stage as a belly dancer in a casino in Adana when she was six years old. However, due to her childhood, she was forbidden to dance in the casino and the casino was also sealed.

Nesrin Gökkaya lost her father when she was 15 years old. She worked in different jobs due to the family's financial difficulties. She went to London in 1968 and started working as a belly dancer in a nightclub under the name "Nesrin Topkapı". Six years later she returned to Turkey. She appeared on the stage in 1974 at the Maksim Casino in Istanbul in honor of the Shah of Iran, Mohammad Reza Pahlavi. Especially in the 1970s, she became one of the most sought-after belly dancers like Tülay Karaca and Seher Şeniz in Turkey.

Nesrin Topkapı worked as a belly dancer in various casinos and nightclubs. She danced live on TRT on New Year's Eve at the end of 1980. He then performed live on TRT for two more New Year's Eves. She refused to dance on TRT with a few belly dancers on New Year's Eve 1984. After she stopped dancing, she gave belly dance lessons to people performing on stage such as Hadise, Sertab Erener, Nurgül Yeşilçay and Nil Karaibrahimgil.

References 

1951 births
Living people
Turkish female dancers
Belly dancers